Deomani Dwivedi is an Indian politician and a member of 17th Legislative Assembly of Lambhua, Uttar Pradesh of India. He represents the Lambhua constituency of Uttar Pradesh and is a member of the Bharatiya Janata Party. He is a former IRTS officer and has served Indian Railway before he resigned in 2016 to join BJP. He was first to take forward the cause to restore the name of Sultanpur to Kushbhawanpur - The land of Lord Kush (Lord Ram’s Son). Following in his footsteps, many local organisations have stepped up for the same cause under his leadership and guidance.  

A gold medalist from Allahabad University and a writer of Hindi small poetry on social and political issues, he has also worked as an assistant professor at Allahabad University before he left and joined UPPCS Police service, after which he resigned and joined UPSC-Indian Railway Services as a Traffic Officer (IRTS).

Political career
Dwivedi has been a member of the 17th Legislative Assembly of Uttar Pradesh. Since 2017, he has represented the Lambhua constituency and is a member of the BJP. 

His recent endeavours of championing the holistic cause of people have made him prime leader and a prominent name in politics of Uttar Pradesh.

Posts held

See also
Uttar Pradesh Legislative Assembly

References

Uttar Pradesh MLAs 2017–2022
Bharatiya Janata Party politicians from Uttar Pradesh
Living people
1964 births